Cunningham Road is one of the busiest commercial streets of Bangalore, the state capital of Karnataka, India. It is located in the Vasanthnagar area of the city. The road is named after Francis Cunningham, who was an officer in the Madras Army and a member of the Mysore Commission. The road was also called Sampangi Ramaswamy Temple Road for some time.

References

Roads in Bangalore
Tourist attractions in Bangalore
Shopping districts and streets in India